Tepa vanduzeei is a species of stink bug in the family Pentatomidae. It is found in Central America and North America.

References

Further reading

 
 
 

Insects described in 1986
Pentatomini